SkyGreece Airlines operated scheduled flights from Greece to Montreal and Toronto. It planned to begin serving New York City soon, Chicago and South Africa.

In June and July 2014, SkyGreece Airlines operated services from Athens to Mogadishu (Somalia), Asmara (Eritrea), London (UK) and Stockholm (Sweden) in association with FlyOlympic of Sweden. The carrier used its single Boeing 767-300ER on these operations. In addition to the scheduled services, SkyGreece also operated charter services on behalf of Royal Air Maroc between Morocco and Saudi Arabia on Umrah and intended Hajj services. SkyGreece Airlines operated ACIM leases to companies such as Air Madagascar during 2014 as well.

Destinations 

All operations were terminated on 25 August 2015.

References

Lists of airline destinations